Rezaiyeh (also Romanized as Reẕā’īyeh; also known as Kalāteh-ye Ḩājj Qorbān and Mīārūd) is a village in Jazin Rural District, in the Central District of Bajestan County, Razavi Khorasan Province, Iran. At the 2006 census, its population was 99, in 29 families.

References 

Populated places in Bajestan County